Qeshlaq-e Owrtadagh may refer to:
Qeshlaq-e Owrtadagh-e Esmail
Qeshlaq-e Owrtadagh-e Hajjiabad
Qeshlaq-e Owrtadagh-e Tapaduq